Sirens Football Club is a professional football club from the north-western seaside village of San Pawl il-Baħar in Malta.
Founded in 1968, they currently compete in the Maltese Premier League.

Club history

Sirens FC was first known as St Paul's Bay Football Team for the Seasons 1968/69 and participated in the Amateur Soccer Cup Competition (ASCC). In their debut season the St Paul's Bay team ended runners up that year. After obtaining such a good placing the committee applied for affiliation in the Third Division of the Malta Football Association.
A delegation from the MFA visited the club, which at that time was at the same premises as the Sirens Aquatic Sports Club. At this point one has to mention Joe Muscat, known as id-Debu, who is the founder of Sirens FC.

Up to 1972 the club was known as Sirens Football Team because as mentioned before, they had no premises until a house was obtained at 61, St Paul's Street, St. Paul's Bay. The new premise was officially opened by the Hon. Minister of Culture and Education, Miss Agatha Barbara on 29 January 1972.

Season 2013–14 The blues left the league with an unbeaten record in the 2013-14 Maltese Third Division that made a big honour to them, Giovanni Galea made his all time goal scoring goals by scoring 44 goals in a single season, making him the record goalscorer in a single season in Maltese football (any level), breaking the record of Danilo Doncic.

On 3 April 2019 Sirens FC secured a historic promotion to the Maltese Premier League as they celebrate the club's fiftieth anniversary after defeating Mqabba 4–0 at the Victor Tedesco Stadium. 17 days after Sirens FC secured a promotion to the Maltese Premier League Sirens FC played against Vittoriosa Stars the game ended a draw no goals, Sirens FC finish as 2018–19 Maltese First Division Champions with 25 games played.

After the first historic promotion, the team achieved another goal securing a place in a European competition for the first time, after reaching the fourth place in the season 2019-20 (terminated on 18 May 2020 due to the effects of the COVID-19 pandemic in the island). In its first ever European match, the team lost against Bulgarian side CSKA Sofia for 2-1, being eliminated in the first qualifying round of the UEFA Europa League.

Sirens Supporters

Sirens Supporters Club (SS.13) is the latest registered supporting club in Malta. The club was founded in 2013 as in that year in 2013-14 Maltese Third Division Sirens FC were in their glory as they won the league title unbeaten and ending the season with a dramatic draw against Swieqi United. Sirens supporters are also called Sirens Ultras 13.

In season 2013–2014 Sirens FC held the record for most supporters in the Malta Third Division, which record was previously held by Attard F.C. and Swieqi United F.C. The support for the Club is constantly growing as presently the club plays in the Maltese Premier League for the first time ever.

Last game and derby of the 2015-16 Maltese Second Division against Mgarr United, Sirens supporters for the first time in the history organized a choreography to celebrate promotion to the Malta First Division. Unfortunately the boys in blue lost the derby and the chance to win the title, but the supporters never stopped chanting for their team that climbed in a higher league.

Sirens rivals are Mgarr United and Mellieha S.C. games between these clubs are usually referred to as The Derby of the North. Matches between Sirens and Mellieha are also called The Blue Derby, as both teams has the same color.

Sirens Stadium
In 2011, they have a newly built training ground and pitch named Sirens Stadium with official Fifa-rated artificial surface.
Most of the team's home games will be played at this venue. Before the stadium was built in the 1970s the St. Paul's Bay Football Club as they was referred to before or the man in blue were played at the MFA stadiums in Ta' Qali till the 2010. The new stadium is built just between Bugibba and St. Paul's Bay as it is situated between the Coast Road highway and high-rise buildings of Bugibba. FIFA officially confirmed that the new Sirens Stadium can host competitive games from two local leagues, Maltese Third Division and the Maltese Second Division. The stadium can hold over 1000 supporters in 3 stands, the left support stand, the VIP area and the right support stand. Usually whenever Sirens play in the stadium supporters use the left side also called the home end.

Presidential history

Kit evolution
First

European record

As of 27 August 2020

Notes
 QR: Qualifying round

Current squad
As of 13 September, 2022.

Achievements

Convenience Challenge Cup Champions:
 2016–17

Mellieha Challenge Cup Champions:
 2015–16

Maltese First Division Champions:
 2018–19

Maltese Second Division Runners-up:
 2015–16

Maltese Third Division Champions:
 1972–73, 1979–80, 1982–83, 1988–89, 2013–14

Maltese Fourth Division Champions :
 1976–77

Maltese Third Division Runners-up:
 2006–07

Division Knock Out Champions :
 1973–74

Division Knock Out Runners-up:
 1992–93, 2002–03

Sons of Malta Cup Champions :
 1974–75

Notes

External links
http://www.sirens-fc.com/

 
Football clubs in Malta
Association football clubs established in 1968
1968 establishments in Malta